The GE BQ23-7 was a model of diesel locomotive manufactured by General Electric, a variant of the B23-7 built between 1978 and 1979 (the 'Q' stood for "crew Quarters"). Mechanically identical to a regular B23-7, but equipped with an enlarged operating cab for accommodating the train crew, thus making a case for eliminating the caboose from the rear of freight trains. SCL no.5130-5139 were the only ones built. Following a practice dating back to ACL and SAL U30Bs of 1967, SCL's 10 BQ23-7s and 30 standard B23-7s were delivered riding on reconditioned Blomberg trucks from EMD trade-ins.

Only ten were built, all for the Seaboard Coast Line railroad, (originally no.5130–5139). CSX later inherited these locomotives, operating them into the late 1990s. These came to be nicknamed "Busses" by the operating crews and "Aegis Cruisers" by some railfans, due to the boxy shape of the locomotive resembling the superstructure of the guided missile cruiser.

None of these locomotives survive today. All were scrapped in 2001.

References

External links
 

B-B locomotives
BQ23-7
Diesel-electric locomotives of the United States
Freight locomotives
Scrapped locomotives
Standard gauge locomotives of the United States
Railway locomotives introduced in 1978